Julie Dunkley (born 11 September 1979) is an English female athlete who competes in the women's shot put. She has a personal best distance of 16.40 metres.

Athletics career
She competed at the 2002 Commonwealth Games in Manchester, England and the 2006 Commonwealth Games in Melbourne, Australia, finishing 7th and 10th respectively.

She is also a five time National Champion, winning two indoor titles in 2001 and 2006 and three outdoor titles in 2004, 2005 and 2006.

Dunkley is a member of Shaftesbury Barnet Harriers.

References

1979 births
Living people
British female shot putters
Athletes (track and field) at the 2002 Commonwealth Games
Athletes (track and field) at the 2006 Commonwealth Games
AAA Championships winners
Commonwealth Games competitors for England